(also written 2007 FT3) is a lost asteroid with a short observation arc of 1.2 days that can not be recovered with targeted observations and awaits serendipitous survey observations. It has a poorly constrained orbit and has not been seen since 2007. It was first observed on 20 March 2007 when the asteroid was estimated to be  from Earth and had a solar elongation of 107 degrees.  is the fourth largest asteroid with better than a 1-in-2 million cumulative chance of impacting Earth after (29075) 1950 DA, 1979 XB, and 101955 Bennu. With a cumulative Palermo Technical Impact Hazard Scale of -2.93, the poorly known orbit and assumed size place  fifth on an unconstrained listing of the Sentry Risk Table.

2013 virtual impactor 
The 2 October 2013 virtual impactor did not occur. The uncertainty region of ± 330 million kilometers wrapped around a large portion of the asteroid's orbit so that the asteroid could have been numerous different distances from the Earth.

2019 virtual impactor 
The 3 October 2019 virtual impactor did not occur. But the line of variation (LOV) for this asteroid was hundreds of millions of kilometers long.

There was an estimated 1 in 11 million chance of the asteroid impacting Earth on 3 October 2019.

2024 virtual impactor 
The nominal orbit suggests that closest approach the asteroid will make to Earth in 2024 will not be until the end of December when it may be ~1 AU from Earth (the same distance the Sun is from Earth). But the line of variation (LOV) for this asteroid is hundreds of millions of kilometers long.

With a short 1.2 day observation arc, the Sentry Risk Table shows an estimated 1 in 11 million chance of the asteroid impacting Earth on 2 October 2024, which is 1,900 times lower than the background threat.

See also 
 1979 XB

Notes

References

External links 
 
 
 

Lost minor planets
Minor planet object articles (unnumbered)

Discoveries by MLS
Potential impact events caused by near-Earth objects
20070320